Meyrick Park Halt was a railway halt located in the Meyrick Park area of Bournemouth, just west of Bournemouth Central railway station in the county of Hampshire (now Dorset) in England. It opened in 1906 as a response to competition from street-running tramways, and served a growing suburb of Bournemouth as well as leisure activities.

History

In May 1905, the London and South Western Railway's (LSWR) board approved the expenditure of £167 on the construction of a halt comprising two short wooden platforms and huts in a cutting on the South West Main Line. It was connected to the lower end of Meyrick Park Crescent in Bournemouth by two flights of steps. The new station would serve the expanding suburb of Winton and Meyrick Park, an area of open space where an extensive golf links had been laid out. The decision to provide the halt followed the recommendation of the LSWR's General Manager, Sir Charles Owens, in February 1905 to meet competition by trams in the Bournemouth area by introducing two steam rail motors which would supplement the existing local service. The station's opening coincided with the introduction of the service on 1 March 1906.

Trams were already well established in the area which led the Bournemouth Guardian newspaper to comment that, although the new station would be useful to golfers, the residents of Winton would most likely continue using the trams which were perceived as more flexible. Local residents had in fact petitioned the LSWR for a station as early as 1894, but it is thought that even if one had been provided, its patronage would have been mostly lost to the trams in any case. This was probably the greatest number of people to ever board a train here; the railway company provided a conventional four coach train in place of the usual push-pull train, and a member of staff from Bournemouth Central was stationed at the halt to supervise boarding.

Bradshaw's Guide for 1910 does not show explicit times for train at the halt, but a note in the station bank states: "Halt at Meyrick Park between Bournemouth Central and Bournemouth West". Although many stopping trains in addition to the motor trains passed the location, it is not possible to infer how many made a call at the halt; nor whether trains from Bournemouth Central towards Poole (not Bournemouth West) made calls.

The halt closed on 1 November 1917 as a First World War austerity measure, but was never reopened. The halt was demolished in 1919.

References

Notes

Sources

Further reading

External links
Meyrick Park

Disused railway stations in Bournemouth
Former London and South Western Railway stations
Railway stations in Great Britain opened in 1906
Railway stations in Great Britain closed in 1917